is an anime television series based on a Japanese fantasy manga series of the same name written and illustrated by Nakaba Suzuki. The series debuted on MBS, TBS and other JNN stations on October 5, 2014. The staff was revealed in the combined 36/37 issue of the year: created by A-1 Pictures, directed by Tensai Okamura, and written by Shōtarō Suga (Lagrange: The Flower of Rin-ne), with Keigo Sasaki (Blue Exorcist) providing character designs and Hiroyuki Sawano composing the music. The show's first opening theme song is  performed by Ikimono-gakari for the first 12 episodes, and the second opening theme is "Seven Deadly Sins" performed by Man with a Mission. While the first ending theme, titled "7-Seven", is a collaboration between Flow and Granrodeo, the second ending theme from episode thirteen onward is "Season", the major label debut of Alisa Takigawa.

The first Seven Deadly Sins anime series was licensed for English release by Netflix as its second exclusive anime, following its acquisition of Knights of Sidonia. All 24 episodes were released on November 1, 2015, in both subtitled or English dub formats. On February 14, 2017, Funimation announced that it acquired the first anime for home video distribution for US and Canada and released the series on Blu-ray and DVD later in the year. Part One of the first season was released on Blu-ray on May 15, 2017, with Part Two being released June 20 the same year. The complete entirety of the first season was released on August 14, 2018. Madman Entertainment is importing Funimation's release into Australia and New Zealand, with a release scheduled for January 2019.

An original video animation (OVA) titled  was included with the limited edition of volume 15 of the manga, released on June 17, 2015. A second OVA composed of nine humorous shorts was shipped with the limited edition of the sixteenth volume of the manga, released on August 12, 2015.



Episode list

References

External links
Official page at Weekly Shōnen Magazine
Official anime website
 (anime) at Netflix
Official video game website

2014 Japanese television seasons
1